Miodrag Aksentijević (born 22 July 1983), is a Serbian futsal player who plays for Tyumen and the Serbia national futsal team. He also represented Serbia national futsal team at UEFA Futsal Euro 2016 in Serbia and 2012 FIFA Futsal World Cup in Thailand.

References

External links
UEFA profile

1983 births
Living people
Futsal goalkeepers
Serbian men's futsal players
People from Prokuplje
Serbian expatriate sportspeople in Russia